USS Chipper has been the name of more than one United States Navy ship, and may refer to:

 , later USS SP-256, a patrol vessel in commission from 1917 to 1918
 , a patrol vessel and ferryboat in commission from 1917 to 1919

United States Navy ship names